The Fort Benton Engine House, on Front and 15th Sts. in Fort Benton, Montana, was built in 1883.  It has also been known as Old City Hall, because it served as city hall for the town for many years.  It was listed on the National Register of Historic Places in 1980.

It is a one-and-a-half-story brick building,  in plan, which was built as a fire station but also served as city hall and jail in its early years.

It is also included in the Fort Benton Historic District.

References

Jails on the National Register of Historic Places in Montana
Fire stations on the National Register of Historic Places in Montana
City and town halls on the National Register of Historic Places in Montana
National Register of Historic Places in Chouteau County, Montana
Government buildings completed in 1883
1883 establishments in Montana Territory